The Pan American Hockey Federation is the field and Indoor hockey federation for the Americas. It consists of 30 Members. It is associated with the International Hockey Federation and hosts several continental competitions for national teams.

Member associations

 Argentina
 Bahamas
 Barbados
 Bermuda
 Bolivia
 Brazil
 Canada
 Cayman Islands
 Chile
 Colombia
 Costa Rica
 Cuba
 Dominican Republic
 Ecuador
 El Salvador
 Guatemala
 Guyana
 Haiti
 Honduras
 Jamaica
 Mexico
 Nicaragua
 Panama
 Paraguay
 Peru
 Puerto Rico
 Trinidad and Tobago
 United States
 Uruguay
 Venezuela

Competitions
Active
Pan American Games
Men's Pan American Cup
Women's Pan American Cup
Men's Pan American Challenge
Women's Pan American Challenge
Men's Pan American Junior Championship
Women's Pan American Junior Championship
Men's Pan American Youth Championship
Women's Pan American Youth Championship
South American Games
South American Youth Games
Men's South American Championship
Women's South American Championship
Central American and Caribbean Games
Men's Indoor Pan American Cup
Women's Indoor Pan American Cup
Central American Championship
Central American Hockey5s Championship

Defunct
Bolivarian Games
Central American Indoor Championships
Pan American Club Championship

Title holders

National team rankings

References

External links
Official website

Field hockey organizations
Field hockey in the Americas
Pan-American sports governing bodies